Jaroslav Pospíšil was the defending champion, but lost in the second round to Potito Starace.

Jason Kubler won the title by defeating Radu Albot 6–4, 6–1 in the final.

Seeds

Draw

Finals

Top half

Bottom half

References
Main Draw
Qualifying Singles

Sibiu Open - Singles
Sibiu Open
2014 in Romanian tennis